Lonaprisan (INN, USAN) (developmental code names ZK-230211, BAY 86-5044, ZK-PRA) is a synthetic, steroidal antiprogestogen which was under development by Bayer HealthCare Pharmaceuticals for the treatment of endometriosis, dysmenorrhea, and breast cancer but was discontinued. It is a potent and highly selective silent antagonist of the progesterone receptor (PR). The drug reached phase II clinical trials prior to its discontinuation.

See also
 Mifepristone
 Onapristone
 Ulipristal acetate
 Vilaprisan

References

External links
 

Antiprogestogens
Diketones
Organofluorides
Tertiary alcohols